Protosuchidae was a family of crocodylomorph reptiles from the Late Triassic, Jurassic, and Cretaceous time periods. They were closely related to the Gobiosuchidae.

Distribution
Triassic protosuchids are known from Lesotho, Argentina, and Arizona.  Jurassic protosuchids are known from Nova Scotia, Poland, South Africa, and Arizona. Cretaceous protosuchids are known from China.

Ecology
Protosuchids were carnivores. An unnamed species of protosuchids known only from teeth was an herbivore.

See also
Protosuchia

References

Terrestrial crocodylomorphs
Triassic crocodylomorpha
Jurassic reptiles
Cretaceous reptiles
Late Triassic first appearances
Early Cretaceous extinctions
Prehistoric reptile families